ICGS Samarth is the Indian Coast Guard's latest and largest Offshore Patrol Vessel (OPV). Samarth is first in the series of six 105m offshore patrol vessels and has been built by Goa Shipyard Limited. The vessel was commissioned to coast guard service on 10 November 2015 by Defence Minister Manohar Parrikar. Samarth is based in Goa and will be extensively used for Exclusive Economic Zone and other duties as it is set to be exploited extensively on the Western Seaboard. The vessel will be under the command of a Deputy Inspector-General.

In 2018 ICGS Samarth and ICGS Shoor, along with Indian Navy vessels, took part in an operation to seize a UAE princess, with controversy as to whether this was a hostage rescue or, in cooperation with the UAE, thwarting an attempt by the princess to escape the UAE.

See also

References

Ships of the Indian Coast Guard